Konrad Dorn (born 29 October 1962) is an Austrian ice hockey player. He competed in the men's tournaments at the 1984 Winter Olympics and the 1988 Winter Olympics.

References

1962 births
Living people
Olympic ice hockey players of Austria
Ice hockey players at the 1984 Winter Olympics
Ice hockey players at the 1988 Winter Olympics
People from Feldkirch, Vorarlberg
Sportspeople from Vorarlberg